is a Japanese manga series written and illustrated by Toshiko Ueda. It was originally serialized in the shōjo (girls) magazine Shōjo Club from 1957 to 1962. Set in early 20th century Manchuria, the series depicts the adventures of Fuichin, the daughter of a servant of a wealthy family, and Li Chu, the son of this family. The series won the 5th Shogakukan Manga Award in 1959, and was adapted into an anime film in 2004.

Synopsis
The series is set in Harbin, Manchuria (located in modern China) at an unspecified date during the occupation of Manchuria by the Empire of Japan in the early 20th century. Fuichin is an independently minded tomboy, but is also kind and good-natured, and is distinguished by her two characteristic long braids of hair.

Despite Fuichin's low status, her sunny disposition wins her the admiration of most people she encounters, including Liu Tai. He asks Fuichin to become the playmate to his youngest son , who is ten years Fuichin's junior. The series comedically illustrates the various adventures and misadventures of Fuichin and Li Chu, including the jealousy of Li Chu's mother, an attempted arranged marriage between Fuichin and Li Chu, and the kidnapping of Li Chu.

Production
Fuichin-san author Toshiko Ueda was born in Japan, but lived in Harbin as a child from 1917 to 1929, and again as an adult from 1943 to 1946. She made her debut as a manga artist in 1937, and between 1937 and 1938 published the series  in the daily newspaper Tokyo Nichi Nichi Shimbun. The series was a humorous yonkoma (four-panel comic strip) featuring a Chinese girl, which Ueda has described as a prototype version of Fuichin-san.

After  repatriating to Japan, Ueda contributed manga to various shōjo (girls) manga magazines in the 1950s. She decided to create a manga series based on her life in Harbin, rendering an idyllic version of history in which the city's Chinese, Japanese and Russian populations live in harmony. China was an atypical setting for shōjo manga of the era, which were typically set in Japan or western settings; Ueda sought to appear to girl readers with a setting that was exotic, but still recognizably Asian. While Ueda drew from her own experience living in Harbin, she elected to make the protagonist of the series Chinese, with the name "Fuichin" drawn from the name of the daughter of the Ueda family's cook in Harbin.

Fuichin-san was published in the magazine Shōjo Club on a monthly basis from the January 1957 issue to the March 1962 issue.

Reception
Fuichin-san is Ueda's most well-known series, and enjoyed a comparable level of popularity to Osamu Tezuka's influential shōjo series Princess Knight, which was published in Shōjo Club from 1953 to 1956. The titular character of Fuichin-san became the mascot of the magazine for the duration of its publication run. In 1959, both Fuichin-san and Ueda's manga series Bonko-chan won the 5th Shogakukan Manga Award.

Adaptation

References

1957 manga
1962 comics endings
2004 anime films
Japanese animated films
Kodansha manga
Shōjo manga
Comics set in China
Films set in Harbin